Kate Elizabeth Méndez Berlant (born 1987) is an American comedian, actress, and writer. Her stand-up comedy and improvisational work are often surrealist and absurdist.

Early life
Kate Elizabeth Méndez Berlant was born in Los Angeles in 1987, the daughter of performer Helen (née Méndez) and artist Tony Berlant. She is of Cuban and Spanish descent on her mother's side, while her father is Jewish. She received a master's degree in performance studies from New York University.

Career
Berlant first appeared on television in a 2002 episode of Lizzie McGuire. She has since had roles in various comedy series, as well as films including Sorry to Bother You (2018), Once Upon a Time in Hollywood (2019), and Don't Worry Darling (2022). She has performed stand-up on The Tonight Show and The Meltdown with Jonah and Kumail, and starred in two episodes of the Netflix sketch comedy series The Characters in 2016. She has performed regularly at the Eugene Mirman Comedy Festival. She has also performed at (and collaborated with) arts institutions including MoMA PS1, White Columns, the Getty Center, and the Los Angeles Museum of Contemporary Art. She won the American version of Taskmaster in 2018. She and John Early created the Vimeo original series 555, which was produced by Abso Lutely Productions.

In June 2022, Berlant and Early released the one-hour sketch comedy special Would It Kill You to Laugh? on Peacock. It was directed by Andrew DeYoung and co-starred Berlant and Early, who play fictionalized versions of themselves in the future who had previously been on the sitcom He's Gay, She's Half-Jewish and are reunited by Meredith Vieira after a bitter falling out. They use the framing device of the reunion to display short skits with absurdist characters that they liked and built upon over a decade of creating and filming short comedy videos, and structured the special around shorter, digestable segments that would be consistent with the popularity of short-form video, but aimed to use comedy that would be timeless. Some of the sketches had been planned for years, but were not filmed until Berlant and Early secured the budget for them. Would It Kill You to Laugh? was backed by both Peacock and A24.

Paste positively compared Would It Kill You to Laugh? to Bo Burnham's special Inside for the way that both use identity in comedy to cause audience reflection, and praised its "no-holds-barred surrealism". Vulture praised the work as a "thoughtful and striking about partnerships and, in particular, about male–female relationships" and considered it "darker and more alarming" than Berlant and Early's previous collaborations. Decider recommended that audiences view it for the pair's ability to mine the "rich comedic tradition for overconfident characters who find themselves in way over their heads but cannot seem to get themselves out of the situation without making things worse". The special was nominated for Best Comedy Special at the 28th Critics' Choice Awards.

Cinnamon in the Wind, Berlant's largely improvised debut stand-up special, was recorded in March 2019 at the Upright Citizens Brigade for FX. It was directed by Burnham, who first suggested that Berlant film a special after going to see one of her performances. Due to reasons that were never explained, the special remained unreleased for over three years until debuting on Hulu in September 2022, coincidentally while Berlant's next Burnham-directed one-woman show Kate was running in New York City. A Decider review praised Cinnamon in the Wind and pointed out the meta-textual element of the comedy. The New Yorker similarly praised Berlant's comedy for "breaking down the typical relationship between performer, ego, and audience".

Personal life
Berlant lives in the Silver Lake neighborhood of Los Angeles. She is a member of the Democratic Socialists of America.

Filmography

Film

Television

References

External links

1987 births
Living people
21st-century American actresses
21st-century American comedians
21st-century American Jews
American film actresses
American people of Cuban descent
American people of Spanish descent
American sketch comedians
American stand-up comedians
American television actresses
American voice actresses
American women comedians
California socialists
Jewish American artists
Members of the Democratic Socialists of America
Upright Citizens Brigade Theater performers